The John Newbery Medal, frequently shortened to the Newbery, is a literary award given by the Association for Library Service to Children (ALSC), a division of the American Library Association (ALA), to the author of "the most distinguished contributions to American literature for children".  The Newbery and the Caldecott Medal are considered the two most prestigious awards for children's literature in the United States. Books selected are widely carried by bookstores and libraries, the authors are interviewed on television, and master's theses and doctoral dissertations are written on them.
Named for John Newbery, an 18th-century English publisher of juvenile books, the winner of the Newbery is selected at the ALA's Midwinter Conference by a fifteen-person committee. The Newbery was proposed by Frederic G. Melcher in 1921, making it the first children's book award in the world. The physical bronze medal was designed by Rene Paul Chambellan and is given to the winning author at the next ALA annual conference. Since its founding there have been several changes to the composition of the selection committee, while the physical medal remains the same.

Besides the Newbery Medal, the committee awards a variable number of citations to leading contenders, called Newbery Honors or Newbery Honor Books; until 1971, these books were called runners-up. As few as zero and as many as eight have been named, but from 1938 the number of Honors or runners-up has been one to five. To be eligible, a book must be written by a United States citizen or resident and must be published first or simultaneously in the United States in English during the preceding year. Six authors have won two Newbery Medals each, several have won both a Medal and Honor, while a larger number of authors have won multiple Honors, with Laura Ingalls Wilder having won five Honors without ever winning the Medal.

History

The Newbery Medal was established on June 22, 1921, at the annual conference of the American Library Association (ALA). Proposed by Publishers Weekly editor Frederic G. Melcher, the proposal was well received by the children's librarians present and then approved by the ALA Executive Board. The award was administered by the ALA from the start, but Melcher provided funds that paid for the design and production of the medal. The Newbery Medal was inaugurated in 1922, considering books published in 1921. According to The Newbery and Caldecott Awards Melcher and the ALA Board agreed to establish the award for several reasons that related to children's librarians. They wanted to encourage quality, creative children's books and to demonstrate to the public that children's books deserve recognition and praise. In 1932 the committee felt it was important to encourage new writers in the field, so a rule was made that an author would win a second Newbery only if the vote was unanimous. The rule was in place until 1958. Joseph Krumgold became the first winner of a second Newbery in 1960. Another change, in 1963, made it clear that joint authors of a book were eligible for the award. Several more revisions and clarifications were added in the 1970s and 1980s. Significantly in 1971, the term Newbery Honor was introduced. Runners-up had been identified annually from the start, with a few exceptions only during the 1920s; all those runners-up were named Newbery Honor Books retroactively.

Medal 

The physical medal was designed by Rene Paul Chambellan and depicts an author giving his work (a book) to a boy and a girl to read on one side and on the other side the inscription, "For the most distinguished contribution to American literature for children". The bronze medal retains the name "Children's Librarians' Section", the original group responsible for awarding the medal, despite the sponsoring committee having changed names four times and now including both school and public librarians. Each winning author gets their own copy of the medal with their name engraved on it. Currently the Association for Library Service to Children (ALSC) is responsible for the award.

Committee 

As Barbara Elleman explained in The Newbery and Caldecott Awards, the original Newbery was based on votes by a selected jury of Children's Librarian Section officers. Books were first nominated by any librarian, then the jury voted for one favorite. Hendrik van Loon's non-fiction history book The Story of Mankind won with 163 votes out of 212. In 1924 the process was changed, and instead of using popular vote it was decided that a special award committee would be formed to select the winner.  The award committee was made up of the Children's Librarian Section executive board, their book evaluation committee and three members at large. In 1929 it was changed again to the four officers, the chairs of the standing committees and the ex-president. Nominations were still taken from members at large.

In 1937 the American Library Association added the Caldecott Award, for "the artist of the most distinguished American picture book for children published in the United States". That year an award committee selected the Medal and Honor books for both awards. In 1978 the rules were changed and two committees were formed of fifteen people each, one for each award. A new committee is formed every year, with "eight elected, six appointed, and one appointed Chair".
The Newbery Medal was named for eighteenth-century British bookseller John Newbery. It is awarded annually by the Association for Library Service to Children, a division of the American Library Association, to the author of the most distinguished contribution to American literature for children.

Selection process
Committee members are chosen to represent a wide variety of libraries, teachers and book reviewers. They read the books on their own time, then meet twice a year for closed discussions. Any book that qualifies is eligible; it does not have to have been nominated. The Newbery is given to the "author of the most distinguished contribution to American literature for children published by an American publisher in the United States in English during the preceding year."  Newbery winners are announced at the Midwinter Meeting of the American Library Association, held in January or February. The Honor Books must be a subset of the runners-up on the final ballot, either the leading runners-up on that ballot or the leaders on one further ballot that excludes the winner.
The results of the committee vote are kept secret, and winners are notified by phone shortly before the award is announced. In 2015, K. T. Horning of the University of Wisconsin–Madison's Cooperative Children's Book Center proposed to ALSC that old discussions of the Newbery and Caldecott be made public in the service of researchers and historians. This proposal was met with both support and criticism by former committee members and recognized authors.

Criticism

In October 2008, Anita Silvey, a children's literary expert, published an article in the School Library Journal criticizing the committee for choosing books that are too difficult for children. Lucy Calkins, of the Reading and Writing Project at Columbia University's Teachers College, agreed with Silvey: "I can't help but believe that thousands, even millions, more children would grow up reading if the Newbery committee aimed to spotlight books that are deep and beautiful and irresistible to kids". But then–ALSC President Pat Scales said, "The criterion has never been popularity. It is about literary quality. How many adults have read all the Pulitzer Prize-winning books and... liked every one?"
John Beach, associate professor of literacy education at St. John's University in New York, compared the books that adults choose for children with the books that children choose for themselves and found that in the past 30 years there is only a five percent overlap between the Children's Choice Awards (International Reading Association) and the Notable Children's Books list (American Library Association). He has also stated that "the Newbery has probably done far more to turn kids off to reading than any other book award in children's publishing."

Recipients

Multiple award winners 

Listed below are all authors who have won at least two Newbery Medals or who have three or more Medals and/or Honors.     Won a Newbery Medal and Honor

See also

 Carnegie Medal for a children's or young-adult book published in the UK
 Michael L. Printz Award for a young-adult book published in the US
 Caldecott Medal for illustration of an American children's picture book
 Children's Literature Legacy Award for lifetime contribution to American children's literature
 Hans Christian Andersen Award for lasting contribution to children's literature

Notes

References

External links

 
 Online editions of Newbery Honor Books and Medal Winners by Women, 1922–1964
 
 Newbery Medal winners at Faded Page  (Canada)
 The Newbery & Caldecott Awards Web Extra: an archive of "distinctive essays" from previous editions of the book.
 The Newbery Video (Part 2), written by Mona Kerby and funded by the International Reading Association highlights favorite Newbery Award books and authors.
 Choices Booklists: Children's Choices
 Interview with Newbery Judge, on Beyond the Margins
 Newbery Medal Winners and Honor Books (including cover art) at smallfrybooks
 
Caldecott and Newbery Medal Wins Bring Instant Boost to Book Sales

 
1922 establishments in the United States
American children's literary awards
American Library Association awards
Awards established in 1922
English-language literary awards